Different Skies is the 1994 debut album by singer and songwriter Cara Jones who, up until its release, had operated solely as a songwriter for other artists.  The album established Jones as an artist in her own right, selling unusual amounts for an indy release and making her the darling of Tokyo radio.

Track listing
All songs by Jones, except where otherwise noted.

"Far Away" – 4:39
"New Life" – 7:13
"Those Were The Days" – 4:15 – Gene Raskin
"Different Skies" – 4:34
"I Thought I Was Over You" – 5:14
"Connecticut" – 3:46
"Far Away (elbow mix)" – 4:41
"Trust" – 3:24
"Those Were The Days (meow mix) – 4:17 – Gene Raskin
"Lover's Lies" – 5:06
"Far Away (alive 'n kicking mix)" – 4:41
"New Life (beatless)" – 4:32

The opening track, "Far Away", broke the top 40 in Tokyo and, despite its virtual lack of promotion, the album went on to sell 15000 copies in its few months on the shelves, before the independent label that had released it moved on to other projects.

Personnel 

Jiro Takada – Electric guitar
Ataru Sumiyoshi – Electric bass
Eiji Otogawa – Soprano Saxophone
Osamu Aoki – Acoustic guitar
Masaaki Mizuno – Acoustic bass
Shoko Tomikawa – Percussion
Shigeo Miyata – Drums
Takuya Sugisawa – Programming
Nobuhiro Makino – Keyboards and piano
Cara Jones, Aki Kudo, Jeff Manning – Backing vocals

External links
 Artist Website: www.carajones.com
 Cara Jones on CD Baby

1994 albums
Cara Jones albums